Nimgiri- Hanumantgad Fort  is Located in Junnar taluka of Pune district in Maharashtra. These two forts  jointly form  two peaks on a same hill . It is one of the seven  important forts along with Hadsar, Chavand, Shivneri, Jivdhan, Narayangad and Sindola forts that protected the trade route during medieval period from Junnar to Kalyan port through Naneghat.

How to reach
The fort is accessible in all seasons. It takes about an hour to reach the fort entrance from the base village Nimgiri. The ascent is very steep till the saddle between the peaks is reached.  It takes another  30 minutes to visit the entire fort.

Places to see
There are a few bastions  in good condition, the rest of the fortification is ruined. There are a few rock cut cisterns and remains of buildings on the fort. There are heroic stones(VeerGal) near the temple on the trek route.

See also 
 List of forts in Maharashtra
 List of forts in India
 Marathi People

References 

 
Forts in Pune district
Tourist attractions in Pune district